Har Sinai Congregation ("Mount Sinai Congregation") is a Reform Jewish synagogue located in Owings Mills, Maryland. Originally established in 1842 in Baltimore, it is the oldest congregation in the United States that has used a Reform prayer rite since its inception.

Many of the original congregants of Har Sinai Congregation came from what was then the Orthodox Jewish Congregation Nidchei Yisroel (later known as the Baltimore Hebrew Congregation), after Rabbi Abraham Rice protested against the performance of Masonic rites at the funeral service of one of its members. The synagogue was originally known as the Har Sinai Verein (Society).

Rabbi David Philipson, in his 1907 work The Reform Movement in Judaism, credited Har Sinai as "the first congregation organized as a reformed congregation" when it was established in 1842. The synagogue adopted the prayer book formulated by the Hamburg Temple, the first reform synagogue in Germany, and services were led by the members. Abram Hutzler, founder of the business that became the progenitor of Hutzler's department store and whose father, Moses Hutzler was a co-founder of the temple, described Har Sinai's earliest practices as "almost orthodox, with covered heads, the separation of the sexes, and the use of 'a Shabbos goy' to light the fires." Later, as part of the congregation's rituals, services were conducted in both Hebrew and English, music was played, and women participated together with men. The first prayer services were held in May 1842 at the residence of Moses Hutzler on Exeter Street and Eastern Avenue, which was above the store that operated on the ground floor. "In 1849, the Congregation built its own temple on High Street in Baltimore and acquired a cemetery."

The synagogue purchased a  property in the northwestern neighborhood of Park Heights from the Maryland Country Club, with a new synagogue dedicated in 1938. A $1 million fundraising program was begun in 1953 by Rabbi Abraham Shusterman. A design modeled on Cleveland's Park Synagogue was created, and following groundbreaking in September 1957, the new structure, the Congregation's fourth home, with seating for 600 and able to accommodate 2,200 for High Holy Days services, was first used in June 1959. During the 1950s, Shusterman was a regular panelist on the weekly television program To Promote Goodwill, an interfaith discussion of social and religious issues by clergy representing Jewish, Catholic, and Protestant views, produced by WBAL-TV and broadcast worldwide on the Voice of America. Owings Mills was chosen as the site of a satellite Hebrew school in 1988 and a  structure was completed there in 2002.

Spiritual leaders
German-born David Einhorn was named on September 29, 1855, as the congregation's first Rabbi. Einhorn formulated the Olat Tamid siddur for use in services, which became one of the models for the Union Prayer Book published in 1894 by the Central Conference of American Rabbis. He also founded "Sinai", a German language newspaper created to promote the Reform movement. In 1861, Einhorn delivered a sermon in which he argued against the institution of slavery in the South as being inconsistent with Jewish values, noting the Jewish experience as slaves in Egypt, despite the fact that many were sympathetic to slavery in what was then a slave state. A riot broke out in response to his sermon on April 19, 1861, in which the mob sought to tar and feather the rabbi. Einhorn fled to Philadelphia, where he became the spiritual leader of the Reform Congregation Keneseth Israel.

Solomon Deutsch served as the congregation's rabbi from 1862 to 1874. Reverend Dr. Jacob Mayer was appointed as Rabbi in 1874, though he was forced to leave the congregation two years later amid allegations that he had previously converted to Christianity and been a missionary in Africa. Emil G. Hirsch, son-in-law of David Einhorn, succeeded Mayer as Rabbi, serving in the position in 1877 and 1878. Samuel Sale was hired in 1878 as the congregation's fifth rabbi and the first to be born in the United States. After receiving his rabbinic ordination in 1883 as one of the first four graduates of Hebrew Union College, David Philipson was named as Har Sinai's rabbi in 1884, and served in the position until 1888.

Since 2010, the current rabbi at Har Sinai is Benjamin Sharff, who was ordained at Hebrew Union College-Jewish Institute of Religion. Floyd L. Herman served as the congregation's rabbi from 1981 to 2003, and now serves in emeritus status.

References

External links

1842 establishments in Maryland
German-Jewish culture in Maryland
Owings Mills, Maryland
Religious buildings and structures in Pikesville, Maryland
Religious organizations established in 1842
Reform synagogues in Maryland
Synagogues in Baltimore County, Maryland
Tarring and feathering in the United States
Synagogues completed in 1959
Synagogues completed in 1849
Synagogues completed in 1938